Sømådal Church is a parish church of the Church of Norway in Engerdal Municipality in Innlandet county, Norway. It is located in the village of Sømådal. It is the church for the Sømådal parish which is part of the Sør-Østerdal prosti (deanery) in the Diocese of Hamar. The brown, wooden church was built in a long church design in 1937. The church seats about 150 people.

History

In 1923, a cemetery was built in Sømådal to serve the northwestern part of the municipality near the border with Rendalen, Tolga, and Os municipalities. In the mid-1930s, the parish began planning for a church at the site of the cemetery. Gustav Knutsen was hired as the lead builder. The new church was consecrated on 1 September 1937.

See also
List of churches in Hamar

References

Engerdal
Churches in Innlandet
Long churches in Norway
Wooden churches in Norway
20th-century Church of Norway church buildings
Churches completed in 1937
1937 establishments in Norway